The 1925 Trinity Tigers football team represented Trinity University as a member of the Texas Intercollegiate Athletic Association (TIAA) during the 1925 college football season. Led by Barry Holton in his first season as head coach, the team compiled an overall record of 9–3 with a 4–2 mark in TIAA play. Trinity played three games against Southwestern Conference opponents, defeating Rice and Baylor and losing to Texas A&M.

Schedule

References

Trinity
Trinity Tigers football seasons
Trinity Tigers football